Two Point Mountain is the highest point in the Boise Mountains with a summit elevation of  located in the Fairfield Ranger District of Sawtooth National Forest, Idaho. The mountain is within the watershed of the South Fork Boise River where the south side is drained by Bear Creek and the north side by the Ross Fork. No maintained trails lead to either summit.

References 

Mountains of Idaho
Mountains of Camas County, Idaho
Sawtooth National Forest